The J. L. Robinson General Store is a historic general store located on Hagaman Road in Hagaman, Macoupin County, Illinois. Railroad worker Charles Crossland Robinson opened the store in 1881; his son James Leo Robinson took over the store upon his father's death, giving it its current name. The store was the main seller of household and farming supplies in Western Mound Township and the Hagaman and Chesterfield areas. In addition, the building served as the township's post office, a railway express office for Macoupin County's two railroads, and the local Democratic Party headquarters. The store was also the first building in the area to receive electricity and telephone service. It is now the only surviving building in the area built before 1900.

The building was added to the National Register of Historic Places on September 12, 1980.

Gallery

References

Commercial buildings on the National Register of Historic Places in Illinois
Commercial buildings completed in 1881
Buildings and structures in Macoupin County, Illinois
National Register of Historic Places in Macoupin County, Illinois
1881 establishments in Illinois